Beaulieu Lake is a lake in Mahnomen County, in the U.S. state of Minnesota.

Beaulieu Lake was named for Alexander H. Beaulieu, a pioneer who settled there.

See also
List of lakes in Minnesota

References

Lakes of Minnesota
Lakes of Mahnomen County, Minnesota